Manetho (Manéthōn, gen.: Μανέθωνος) is believed to have been an Egyptian priest from Sebennytos who lived in the Ptolemaic Kingdom in the early third century BC, during the Hellenistic period. He authored the Aegyptiaca (History of Egypt) in Greek, a major chronological source for the reigns of the kings of ancient Egypt. It is unclear if he wrote his history and king list during the reign of Ptolemy I Soter or Ptolemy II Philadelphos, but it was completed no later than that of Ptolemy III Euergetes.

Name
The original Egyptian version of Manetho's name is lost, but some speculate it means "Truth of Thoth", "Gift of Thoth", "Beloved of Thoth", "Beloved of Neith", or "Lover of Neith". Less accepted proposals are Myinyu-heter ("Horseherd" or "Groom") and Ma'ani-Djehuti ("I have seen Thoth").

In the Greek language, the earliest fragments (the inscription of uncertain date on the base of a marble bust from the temple of Serapis at Carthage and the Jewish historian Flavius Josephus of the 1st century AD) wrote his name as Μανέθων Manethōn, so the Latinised rendering of his name here is given as Manetho. Other Greek renderings include Manethōs, Manethō, Manethos, Manēthōs, Manēthōn, and Manethōth. In Latin it is written as Manethon, Manethos, Manethonus, and Manetos.

Life and work
Although no sources for the dates of his life and death remain, Manetho is associated with the reign of Ptolemy I Soter (323–283 BC) by Plutarch (c. 46–120 AD), while George Syncellus links Manetho directly with Ptolemy II Philadelphus (285–246 BC).

If the mention of someone named Manetho in the Hibeh Papyri, dated to 241/240 BC, is in fact the celebrated author of the Aegyptiaca, then Manetho may well have been working during the reign of Ptolemy III Euergetes (246–222 BC) as well, but at a very advanced age. Although the historicity of Manetho of Sebennytus was taken for granted by Josephus and later authors, the question as to whether he existed remains problematic. The Manetho of the Hibeh Papyri has no title and this letter deals with affairs in Upper Egypt not Lower Egypt, where our Manetho is thought to have functioned as a chief priest. The name Manetho is rare, but there is no reason a priori to presume that the Manetho of the Hibeh Papyri is the priest and historian from Sebennytus who is thought to have authored the Aegyptiaca for Ptolemy Philadelphus.

Manetho is described as a native Egyptian and Egyptian would have been his mother tongue. Although the topics he supposedly wrote about dealt with Egyptian matters, he is said to have written exclusively in the Greek language for a Greek-speaking audience. Other literary works attributed to him include Against Herodotus, The Sacred Book, On Antiquity and Religion, On Festivals, On the Preparation of Kyphi, and the Digest of Physics. The treatise Book of Sothis has also been attributed to Manetho. These works are not attested during the Ptolemaic period when Manetho of Sebennytus is said to have lived and only  mentioned in another source in the first century AD, leaving a gap of 200–300 years between the composition of the Aegyptiaca and its first attestation. The gap is even larger for the other works attributed to Manetho such as The Sacred Book that is mentioned for the very first time by Eusebius in the fourth century AD.

Manetho of Sebennytus was probably a priest of the sun-god Ra at Heliopolis (according to George Syncellus, he was the chief priest). He was considered by Plutarch to be an authority on the cult of Serapis (a derivation of Osiris and Apis). Serapis was a Greco-Macedonian version of the Egyptian cult, probably started after Alexander the Great's establishment of Alexandria in Egypt. A statue of the deity was imported in 286 BC by Ptolemy I Soter (or in 278 BC by Ptolemy II Philadelphus) as Tacitus and Plutarch attest. There was also a tradition in antiquity that Timotheus of Athens (an authority on Demeter at Eleusis) directed the project together with Manetho, but the source of this information is not clear and it may originate from one of the literary works attributed to Manetho, in which case it has no independent value and does not corroborate the historicity of Manetho the priest-historian of the early third century BC.

Aegyptiaca
The Aegyptiaca (Aigyptiaka), the "History of Egypt", may have been Manetho's largest work, and certainly the most important. It was organised chronologically and divided into three volumes. His division of rulers into dynasties was an innovation. However, he did not use the term in the modern sense, by bloodlines, but rather, introduced new dynasties whenever he detected some sort of discontinuity, whether geographical (Dynasty Four from Memphis, Dynasty Five from Elephantine), or genealogical (especially in Dynasty One, he refers to each successive king as the "son" of the previous to define what he means by "continuity"). Within the superstructure of a genealogical table, he fills in the gaps with substantial narratives of the kings.

Some have suggested  that Aegyptiaca was written as a competing account to Herodotus' Histories, to provide a national history for Egypt that did not exist before. From this perspective, Against Herodotus may have been an abridged version or just a part of Aegyptiaca that circulated independently. Unfortunately, neither survives in its original form today.

Two English translations of the fragments of Manetho's Aegyptiaca have been published, by William Gillan Waddell in 1940, later by Gerald P. Verbrugghe and John Moore Wickersham in 2001.

Transmission and reception 

Despite the reliance of Egyptologists on him for their reconstructions of the Egyptian dynasties, the problem with a close study of Manetho is that not only was Aegyptiaca not preserved as a whole, but it also became involved in a rivalry among advocates of Egyptian, Jewish, and Greek histories in the form of supporting polemics. During this period, disputes raged concerning the oldest civilizations, and so Manetho's account was probably excerpted during this time for use in this argument with significant alterations. Material similar to Manetho's has been found in Lysimachus of Alexandria, a brother of Philo, and it has been suggested  that this was inserted into Manetho. We do not know when this might have occurred, but scholars  specify a terminus ante quem at the first century AD, when Josephus began writing.

The earliest surviving attestation to Manetho is that of Contra Apionem ("Against Apion") by Flavius Josephus, nearly four centuries after Aegyptiaca was composed. Even here, it is clear that Josephus did not have the originals, and constructed a polemic against Manetho without them. Avaris and Osarseph are both mentioned twice (1.78, 86–87; 238, 250). Apion 1.95–97 is merely a list of kings with no narratives until 1.98, while running across two of Manetho's dynasties without mention (dynasties eighteen and nineteen).

Contemporaneously or perhaps after Josephus wrote, an epitome of Manetho's work must have been circulated. This would have involved preserving the outlines of his dynasties and a few details deemed significant. For the first ruler of the first dynasty, Menes, we learn that "he was snatched and killed by a hippopotamus". The extent to which the epitome preserved Manetho's original writing is unclear, so caution must be exercised. Nevertheless, the epitome was preserved by Sextus Julius Africanus and Eusebius of Caesarea. Because Africanus predates Eusebius, his version is usually considered more reliable, but there is no assurance that this is the case. Eusebius in turn was preserved by Jerome in his Latin translation, an Armenian translation, and by George Syncellus. Syncellus recognized the similarities between Eusebius and Africanus, so he placed them side by side in his work, Ecloga Chronographica.

Africanus, Syncellus, and the Latin and Armenian translations of Eusebius are what remains of the epitome of Manetho. Other significant fragments include Malalas's Chronographia and the Excerpta Latina Barbari, a bad translation of a Greek chronology.

Sources and methods
Manetho's methods involved the use of king-lists to provide a structure for his history. There were precedents to his writing available in Egypt (plenty of which have survived to this day), and his Hellenistic and Egyptian background would have been influential in his writing. Josephus records him admitting to using "nameless oral tradition" (1.105) and "myths and legends" (1.229) for his account, and there is no reason to doubt this, as admissions of this type were common among historians of that era. His familiarity with Egyptian legends is indisputable, but how he learned Greek legends is more open to debate. He must have been familiar with Herodotus, and in some cases, he even attempted to synchronize Egyptian history with Greek (for example, equating King Memnon with Amenophis, and Armesis with Danaos). This suggests he was also familiar with the Greek Epic Cycle (for which the Ethiopian Memnon is slain by Achilles during the Trojan War) and the history of Argos (in Aeschylus's Suppliants). However, it has also been suggested that these were later interpolations, particularly when the epitome was being written, so these guesses are at best tentative.

At the very least, he wrote in fluent Koinê Greek.

King lists
At the behest of Ptolemy Philadelphus (266–228 BC), Manetho copied down a list of eight successive Persian kings, beginning with Cambyses, the son of Cyrus the Great. Manetho's record of regnal years for these kings is mostly corroborated by Ptolemy of Alexandria in his Canon, excepting for the fact that Artabanus who reigned for only 7 months is omitted by Ptolemy, while Ptolemy puts 8 years (instead of 5) for Cambyses' reign.
Cambyses (Artaxerxes) b. Cyrus = reigned over Persia, his own kingdom, for 5 years, and over Egypt for 6 years.
Darius (II), the son of Hystaspes = reigned 36 years.
Xerxes (Artaxerxes), the Great, b. Darius = reigned 21 years.
Artabanus = reigned 7 months.
Artaxerxes (Cyrus) b. Xerxes the Great = reigned 41 years.
Xerxes = reigned 2 months.
Sogdianus = reigned 7 months.
Darius (III), the son of Xerxes = reigned 19 years.

It is to be noted here that between Cambyses' reign and Darius, the son of Hystaspes, there was an interim period whereby the Magi ruled over Persia. This important anecdote is supplied by Herodotus who wrote the Magian ruled Persia for 7 months after the death of Cambyses. Josephus, on the other hand, says they obtained the government of the Persians for a year.

The king-list that Manetho had access to is unknown to us, but of the surviving king-lists, the one most similar to his is the Turin Royal Canon (or Turin Papyrus). The oldest source with which we can compare to Manetho are the Old Kingdom Annals (c. 2500-2200 BC). From the New Kingdom are the list at Karnak (constructed by order of Thutmose III), two at Abydos (by Seti I and Ramesses II— the latter a duplicate, but updated version of the former), and the Saqqara list by the priest Tenry.

The provenance of the Old Kingdom Annals is unknown, surviving as the Palermo Stone. The differences between the Annals and Manetho are great. The Annals only reach to the fifth dynasty, but its pre-dynastic rulers are listed as the kings of Lower Egypt and kings of Upper Egypt. By contrast, Manetho lists several Greek and Egyptian deities beginning with Hephaistos and Helios. Secondly, the Annals give annual reports of the activities of the kings, while there is little probability that Manetho would have been able to go into such detail.

The New Kingdom lists are each selective in their listings: that of Seti I, for instance, lists seventy-six kings from dynasties one to nineteen, omitting the Hyksos rulers and those associated with the heretic Akhenaten. The Saqqara king list, contemporaneous with Ramesses II, has fifty-eight names, with similar omissions. If Manetho used these lists at all, he would have been unable to get all of his information from them alone, due to the selective nature of their records. Verbrugghe and Wickersham argue:

These large stelae stand in contrast to the Turin Royal Canon (such as Saqqara, contemporaneous with Ramesses II), written in hieratic script. Like Manetho, it begins with the deities, and seems to be an epitome very similar in spirit and style to Manetho. Interestingly, the opposite side of the papyrus includes government records. Verbrugghe and Wickersham suggest that a comprehensive list such as this would be necessary for a government office "to date contracts, leases, debts, titles, and other instruments (2000:106)" and so could not have been selective in the way the king-lists in temples were. Despite numerous differences between the Turin Canon and Manetho, the format must have been available to him. As a priest (or chief priest), he would have had access to practically all written materials in the temple.

While the precise origins for Manetho's king-list are unknown, it was certainly a northern, Lower Egyptian one. This can be deduced most noticeably from his selection of the kings for the Third Intermediate Period. Manetho consistently includes the Tanite Dynasty Twenty-one and Dynasty Twenty-two lineage in his Epitome such as Psusennes I, Amenemope and even such short-lived kings as Amenemnisu (five years) and Osochor (six years). In contrast, he ignores the existence of Theban kings such as Osorkon III, Takelot III, Harsiese A, Pinedjem I, and kings from Middle Egypt such as Peftjaubast of Herakleopolis. This implies that Manetho derived the primary sources for his Epitome from a local city's temple library in the region of the River Nile Delta which was controlled by the Tanite-based Dynasty Twenty-one and Dynasty Twenty-two kings. The Middle and Upper Egyptian kings did not have any effect upon this specific region of the delta; hence their exclusion from Manetho's king-list.

Transcriptions of Pharaonic names
By the Middle Kingdom, Egyptian kings each had five different names, the "Horus" name; the "Two Ladies" name; the "Gold Horus" name; the praenomen or "throne name"; and a nomen, the personal name given at birth (also called a "Son of Ra" name as it was preceded by Sa Re'). Some kings also had multiple examples within these names, such as Ramesses II who used six Horus names at various times. Because Manetho's transcriptions agree with many king-lists, it is generally accepted that he was reliant on one or more such lists, and it is not clear to what extent he was aware of the different pharaonic names of rulers long past (and he had alternate names for some). Not all of the different names for each king have been uncovered.

Manetho did not choose consistently from the five different types of names, but in some cases, a straightforward transcription is possible. Egyptian Men or Meni (Son of Ra and king-list names) becomes Menes (officially, this is Pharaoh I.1 Narmer—"I" represents Dynasty I, and "1" means the first king of that dynasty), while Menkauhor/Menkahor (Throne and king-list names, the Horus names is Menkhau and the Son of Ra name is "Kaiu Horkaiu[...]") is transcribed as Menkheres (V.7 Menkauhor). Others involve a slight abbreviation, such as A'akheperen-Re' (Throne and king-list names) becoming Khebron (XVIII.4 Thutmose II). A few more have consonants switched for unknown reasons, as for example Tausret becoming Thouoris (XIX.6 Twosre/Tausret). One puzzle is in the conflicting names of some early dynastic kings— although they did not have all five titles, they still had multiple names. I.3/4 Djer, whose Son of Ra name is Itti is considered the basis for Manetho's I.2 Athothis. I.4 Oenephes then is a puzzle unless it is compared with Djer's Gold Horus name, Ennebu. It may be that Manetho duplicated the name or he had a source for a name unknown to us. Finally, there are some names where the association is a complete mystery to us. V.6 Rhathoures/Niuserre's complete name was Set-ib-tawi Set-ib-Nebty Netjeri-bik-nebu Ni-user-Re' Ini Ni-user-Re', but Manetho writes it as Rhathoures. It may be that some kings were known by names other than even just the five official ones.

Thus, how Manetho transcribed these names varies, and as such, we cannot reconstruct the original Egyptian forms of the names. However, because of the simplicity with which Manetho transcribed long names (see above), they were preferred until original king-lists began to be uncovered in Egyptian sites, translated, and corroborated. Manetho's division of dynasties, however, is still used as a basis for all Egyptian discussions.

Content
Volume 1 begins from the earliest times, listing deities and demigods as kings of Egypt. Stories of Isis, Osiris, Set, or Horus might have been found here. Manetho does not transliterate either, but gives the Greek equivalent deities by a convention that predates him: (Egyptian) Ptah = (Greek) Hephaistos; Isis = Demeter; Thoth = Hermes; Horus = Apollo; Seth = Typhon; etc. This is one of the clues as to how syncretism developed between seemingly disparate religions. He then proceeds to Dynastic Egypt, from Dynasty One to Eleven. This would have included the Old Kingdom, the First Intermediate Period, and the early Middle Kingdom.

Volume 2 covers Dynasties Twelve–Nineteen, which includes the end of the Middle Kingdom and the Second Intermediate Period (Fifteen–Seventeen—the Hyksos invasion), and then their expulsion and the establishment of the New Kingdom (Eighteen onward). The Second Intermediate Period was of particular interest to Josephus, where he equated the Hyksos or "shepherd-kings" as the ancient Israelites who eventually made their way out of Egypt (Apion 1.82–92). He even includes a brief etymological discussion of the term "Hyksos".

Volume 3 continues with Dynasty Twenty and concludes with Dynasty Thirty (or Thirty-one, see below). The Saite Renaissance occurs in Dynasty Twenty-six, while Dynasty Twenty-seven involves the Achaemenid interruption of Egyptian rule. Three more local dynasties are mentioned, although they must have overlapped with Persian rule. Dynasty Thirty-one consisted of three Persian rulers, and some have suggested that this was added by a continuator. Both Moses of Chorene and Jerome end at Nectanebo II ("last king of the Egyptians" and "destruction of the Egyptian monarchy" respectively), but Dynasty Thirty-one fits within Manetho's schemata of demonstrating power through the dynasteia well. The Thirty-second dynasty would have been the Ptolemies.

Similarities with Berossos
Most of the ancient witnesses group Manetho together with Berossos, and treat the pair as similar in intent, and it is not a coincidence that those who preserved the bulk of their writing are largely the same (Josephus, Africanus, Eusebius, and Syncellus). Certainly, both wrote about the same time, and both adopted the historiographical approach of the Greek writers Herodotus and Hesiod, who preceded them. While the subjects of their history are different, the form is similar, using chronological royal genealogies as the structure for the narratives. Both extend their histories far into the mythic past, to give the deities rule over the earliest ancestral histories.

Syncellus goes so far as to insinuate that the two copied each other:

While this does seem an incredible coincidence, the reliability of the report is unclear. The reasoning for presuming they started their histories in the same year involved some considerable contortions. Berossos dated the period before the Flood to 120 saroi (3,600 year periods), giving an estimate of 432,000 years before the Flood. This was unacceptable to later Christian commentators, so it was presumed he meant solar days. 432,000 divided by 365 days gives a rough figure of 1,183½ years before the Flood. For Manetho, even more numeric contortions ensued. With no flood mentioned, they presumed that Manetho's first era describing the deities represented the ante-diluvian age. Secondly, they took the spurious Book of Sothis for a chronological count. Six dynasties of deities totalled 11,985 years, while the nine dynasties with demigods came to 858 years. Again, this was too long for the Biblical account, so two different units of conversion were used. The 11,985 years were considered to be months of 29½ days each (a conversion used in antiquity, for example by Diodorus Siculus), which comes out to 969 years. The latter period, however, was divided into seasons, or quarters of a year, and reduces to 214½ years (another conversion attested to by Diodorus). The sum of these comes out to 1,183½ years, equal to that of Berossos. Syncellus rejected both Manetho's and Berossos' incredible time-spans, as well as the efforts of other commentators to harmonise their numbers with the Bible. Ironically as we see, he also blamed them for the synchronicity concocted by later writers.

Effect of Aegyptiaca
It is speculated that Manetho wrote at the request of Ptolemy I or Ptolemy II to give an account of the history of Egypt to the Greeks from a native perspective. However, there is no evidence for this hypothesis. If such were the case, Aegyptiaca was a failure, since Herodotus' Histories continued to provide the standard account in the Hellenistic world. It may also have been that some nationalistic sentiments in Manetho provided the impetus for his writing, but that again is a conjecture. It is clear, however, that when it was written, it would have proven to be the authoritative account of the history of Egypt, superior to Herodotus in every way. The completeness and systematic nature in which he collected his sources was unprecedented.

Syncellus similarly recognised its importance when recording Eusebius and Africanus, and even provided a separate witness from the Book of Sothis. Unfortunately, this material is likely to have been a forgery or hoax of unknown date. Every king in Sothis after Menes is irreconcilable with the versions of Africanus and Eusebius. Manetho should not be judged on the factuality of his account, but on the method he used to record history, and in this, he was as successful as Herodotus and Hesiod.

Finally, in modern times, the effect is still visible in the way Egyptologists divide the dynasties of the Egyptian kings. The French explorer and Egyptologist Jean-François Champollion reportedly held a copy of Manetho's lists in one hand as he attempted to decipher the hieroglyphs he encountered (although it probably gave him more frustration than joy, considering the way Manetho transcribed the names). Most modern scholarship that mentions the names of the kings will render both the modern transcription and Manetho's version, and in some cases Manetho's names are even preferred to more authentic ones. Today, his division of dynasties is used universally, and this has permeated the study of nearly all royal genealogies by the conceptualization of succession in terms of dynasties or houses.

As a root of antisemitism 
Manetho has been cited as an early example of antisemitism. Manetho's history of Egypt, potentially presented as a counter-narrative to the traditional story of Exodus, portrays Jews negatively; Manetho's depiction of Jews — or Lepers and Shepherds – exudes anti-Jewish themes. While the Old Testament's Exodus tells of the Jews escaping Egypt, liberating themselves, Manetho tells a different story: that Egypt expelled lepers because of their impurity who then chose to revolt against Egypt pioneered by leader Osarsiph — later revealing himself as Moses — who imposed various anti-Egyptian laws. Together with the Shepherds, they conquered Egypt in a 'barbarous manner…set[ting] the cities and villages on fire…roasting those sacred animals…and forced the priests and prophets to be the exectutioners and murders of those sacred animals." Negative themes of the Jews followed, such as being characterized as misanthropic or tyrannical. Osarsiph also declared that “they should neither worship the Egyptian gods; nor should abstain from any one of those sacred animals which they have in the highest esteem.”

See also

Berossus
History of Ancient Egypt
List of lists of ancient kings
Ptolemaic dynasty

Notes

References
 Josephus, Titus Flavius, ca 70-90 B.C.E Against Apion
 Barclay, John M.G., 2011. Flavius Josephus: Translation and Commentary, Volume 10: Against Apion. Brill: .
 Palmer, W., 1861. Egyptian Chronicles: Vol. II. London.
 Waddell, William Gillian, ed. 1940. Manetho. The Loeb Classical Library 350, ser. ed. George P. Goold. London and Cambridge: William Heinemann ltd. and Harvard University Press. .

Further reading
Helck, Hans Wolfgang. 1975. "Manethon (1)". In Der kleine Pauly: Lexikon der Antike, auf der Grundlage von Pauly's Realencyclopädie der classischen Altertumswissenschaft, edited by Konrat Ziegler, Walter Sontheimer, and Hans Gärtner. Vol. 3. München: Alfred Druckenmüller Verlag. 952–953. .
Laqueur, Richard. 1928. "Manethon". In Paulys Real-Encyclopädie der classischen Altertumswissenschaft, edited by August Friedrich von Pauly, Georg Wissowa, and Wilhelm Kroll. Vol. 14 of 24 vols. Stuttgart: Alfred Druckenmüller Verlag. 1060–1106. .
Cerqueiro, Daniel 2012. "Aegyptos fragmentos de una aegyptiaca recóndita". Buenos Aires:Ed.Peq.Ven. .
M.A. Leahy. 1990. "Libya and Egypt c1300–750 BC." London: School of Oriental and African Studies, Centre of Near and Middle Eastern Studies, and The Society for Libyan Studies.
Redford, Donald Bruce. 1986a. "The Name Manetho". In Egyptological Studies in Honor of Richard A. Parker Presented on the Occasion of His 78th Birthday, December 10, 1983, edited by Leonard H. Lesko. Hannover and London: University Press of New England. 118–121. .
———. 1986b. Pharaonic King–Lists, Annals and Day–Books: A Contribution to the Study of the Egyptian Sense of History. Society for the Study of Egyptian Antiquities Publications 4, ser. ed. Loretta M. James. Mississauga: Benben Publications. .
———. 2001. "Manetho". In The Oxford Encyclopedia of Ancient Egypt, edited by Donald Bruce Redford. Vol. 2 of 3 vols. Oxford, New York, and Cairo: Oxford University Press and The American University in Cairo Press. 336–337. .
Thissen, Heinz-Josef. 1980. "Manetho". In Lexikon der Ägyptologie, edited by Hans Wolfgang Helck, and Wolfhart Westendorf. Vol. 3 of 7 vols. Wiesbaden: Otto Harrassowitz. 1180–1181. .
Verbrugghe, Gerald P., and John Moore Wickersham. 1996. Berossos and Manetho, Introduced and Translated: Native Traditions in Ancient Mesopotamia and Egypt. Ann Arbor: University of Michigan Press. .

External links

Chronologie de Manéthon showing the names given by Manetho and the names used now 
Manetho: History of Egypt, Sacred Book, etc.
Who's Who in Ancient Egypt: Manetho
"The First Egyptian Narrative History: Manetho and Greek Historiography", ZPE 127 (1999), pp.93-116 by J. Dillery

3rd-century BC births
3rd-century BC deaths
3rd-century BC clergy
3rd-century BC Egyptian people
3rd-century BC historians
Ancient Egyptian historians
Ancient Egyptian priests
Texts in Koine Greek
Hellenistic writers
Hellenistic-era historians
King lists